Bulbophyllum abbrevilabium, also known as the short-lipped bulbophyllum, is a warm-growing species of orchid in the genus Bulbophyllum.  It is found in the Southeast Asian countries Thailand, Malaysia and Vietnam.
It bears a flower about eight millimetres wide.  Akin to the majority of orchid species, it is a pseudobulb epiphyte, and is typically found hanging from tree branches.

References

External links
The Bulbophyllum-Checklist
The Internet Orchid Species Photo Encyclopedia

abbrevilabium
Plants described in 1932